Capillas is a Spanish municipality located in the province of Palencia, Castile and León. In 2013, its population was 86.

History
The town was first mentioned in 916 as Fonte de Capela, one of the first settlements of the region. Its name, in Spanish, means "chapels".

Geography
The municipality borders Boada de Campos, Castil de Vela, Castromocho, Gatón de Campos (in the province of Valladolid), Meneses de Campos and Villarramiel.

Demographics

Personality
Francisco Blanco Salcedo, born here in 1512, was Archbishop of Santiago de Compostela for seven years.

References

External links

 Capillas official website

Municipalities in the Province of Palencia